The 1994 Campeonato Argentino de Rugby   was won by the selection of Buenos Aires that beat in the final the selection of Cordoba.
The 21 teams participating, were divide in three levels : "Campeonato" (assigning the title), "Ascenso", "Clasificacion".

Rugby Union in Argentina in 1994

National 
 The "Campeonato Argentino Menores de 21" (Under 21 championship) was won by Buenos Aires
 The "Campeonato Juvenil" (Under 19 championship) was won by Cordoba
 The "National Championship for clubs" was won by San Isidro Club, beating in the final La Tablada
 The "Torneo de la URBA" (Buenos Aires) was won by San Isidro Club
 The "Cordoba Province Championship" was won by La Tablada
 The North-East Championship was won by Los Tarcos

International
 Argentina, beating United States, obtained the qualification to 1995 Rugby World Cup
 Scotland visit Argentina. Pumas won both test match against "Pumas" (16-15), (19-27)

 Argentina visit South Africa, losing both tests against "Springboks"

Queensland Reds, visited Argentina playing six match against provincial selections.

"Campeonato" 
The better eight teams played for title. They were divided in tow pools of four, the first two each pools admitted to semifinals, the last relegated in second division

Pool "A"

Pool "B"

Semifinals

Final

"Ascenso"

Pool A

Pool B

"Classification"

Pool A 

Promoted: Misiones

Pool B 

Promoted: Centro

References

External links 
 Memorias de la UAR 1994
  Francesco Volpe, Paolo Pacitti (Author), Rugby 2000, GTE Gruppo Editorale (1999)

Campeonato Argentino de Rugby
Argentina
Campeonato